Milan Rodić (born 2 April 1991) is a Serbian professional footballer who plays as a left-back for Red Star Belgrade and the Serbia national football team.

Club career

OFK Beograd
Rodić played his first professional match for OFK Beograd on 26 April 2009, against Partizan at the age of 18. Almost two years later, on 25 April 2012, he was named left-back in Sportal's ideal team of Round 26 in the 2011–12 Serbian SuperLiga.

Zenit Saint Petersburg
On 31 January 2013, Rodić signed a contract with Zenit Saint Petersburg. On 21 February 2013, coach Luciano Spalletti deployed Rodić in the 85th minute as a substitute for Sergei Semak against Liverpool in the 2012–13 UEFA Europa League. However, Rodić ended up playing only five matches for Zenit before being loaned out to FC Volga Nizhny Novgorod and Zenit's reserve team, after which he transferred to Krylia Sovetov.

Krylia Sovetov
In August 2015, Rodić signed with Krylia Sovetov. Over the course of two seasons, Rodić got back into competitive shape. After two years with Krylia Sovetov, Rodić thanked the fans and commented that he was happy to play for Krylia, but that he missed his family in Serbia.

Red Star Belgrade
On 21 July 2017, Rodić signed a three-year contract with Serbian side Red Star Belgrade. Red Star had paid approximately €250,000 to Krylia Sovetov for Rodić's transfer. He played in Red Star's 2017–18 UEFA Europa League campaign under coach Vladan Milojević. On 19 October 2017, Rodić got a red card in the Group H home match against Arsenal, which Red Star lost 1–0. On 12 March 2019, he extended his contract with Red Star to the summer of 2022.

International career
On 6 June 2011, Rodić made his debut with the Serbia national under-21 football team against Sweden's U-21 team. Five years later, Rodić got his first call up to the senior Serbia squad for a friendly match against Russia on 5 June 2016.

In May 2018 he was named in Serbia's preliminary squad for the 2018 FIFA World Cup in Russia.
On 4 June, he made his international debut in a friendly match against Chile, coming on as a substitute for Aleksandar Kolarov in the 80th minute. He was selected in Serbia’s squad for the 2018 World Cup, but he failed to make any appearances there.

Career statistics

Club

International

Honours
Zenit Saint Petersburg
Russian Football Premier League: 2014–15

Red Star Belgrade
 Serbian SuperLiga: 2017–18, 2018–19, 2019–20, 2020–21, 2021–22
 Serbian Cup: 2020–21, 2021–22

References

External sources
Milan Rodić at Utakmica.rs

1991 births
Living people
People from Drvar
Serbs of Bosnia and Herzegovina
Serbian footballers
Association football defenders
Serbia under-21 international footballers
OFK Beograd players
FC Zenit Saint Petersburg players
Serbian SuperLiga players
Russian Premier League players
Serbian expatriate footballers
Expatriate footballers in Russia
Serbian expatriate sportspeople in Russia
FC Volga Nizhny Novgorod players
PFC Krylia Sovetov Samara players
Red Star Belgrade footballers
2018 FIFA World Cup players
Serbia international footballers
FC Zenit-2 Saint Petersburg players